The three-banded warbler (Basileuterus trifasciatus) is a species of bird in the family Parulidae.
It is found in Ecuador and Peru.
Its natural habitats are subtropical or tropical moist montane forests and heavily degraded former forest.

References

External links
Three-banded warbler photos on antpitta.com

three-banded warbler
Birds of Ecuador
Birds of Peru
Birds of the Tumbes-Chocó-Magdalena
three-banded warbler
three-banded warbler
Taxonomy articles created by Polbot